The Superintendency of Industry and Commerce (SIC) is the Competition regulator in Colombia. It is the statutory body of Government of Colombia in charge of regulating fair business practices, promoting competitiveness and acting as the Colombian patent and registration office.

References

Government agencies established in 1968
Ministry of Commerce, Industry and Tourism (Colombia)
Competition regulators
Patent offices
Consumer organisations in Colombia
Regulators of Colombia